Alexander, also known as Ishaq Beg (ისაკ-ბეგი) (c. 1705/8 – September 1773), was an illegitimate son of the Georgian ruler Jesse of Kartli, of the Bagrationi-Mukhraneli, politically active in Georgia in the 1740s. His progeny subsequently flourished in the Russian Empire, producing a line of several notable figures of the 19th century, among them General Pyotr Bagration of the Napoleonic Wars fame.

Career 

Alexander was born in Safavid Iran as a Muslim, and was called Ishaq Beg. From 1743 to 1744, he served as a lieutenant (janisin) of Kartli, then under the Iranian sway. He was soon removed from the office by his cousin Teimuraz II, of the rival Bagrationi branch from Kakheti, who became king of Kartli in 1744. Ishaq Beg joined the opposition faction led by his half-brother Abdullah Beg, but soon had to submit to the ascending power of the Kakhetian Bagrationi. In 1750, he converted to Christianity, baptized with the name Alexander and received a fief in Kvemo Kartli. Soon, his relations with Teimuraz again went downhill and Alexander fled to Russia in 1759. He entered the Russian military service and first joined a garrison at Astrakhan and then, in 1761, the Georgian squadron in Kizlyar in the ranks of podpolkovnik.

Family 

Alexander fathered five sons (and probably three daughters):
Prince Ivane (Ivan Aleksandrovich Bagration; 1730–1795), Second Major of the Russian army. He was father of Pyotr, Roman, and Alexander.
Solomon
Kiril (Kiril Aleksandrovich Bagration; 1750–1828), Major-General of the Russian army and a senator. 
Tamaz (Thomas) (1743 – c. 1759)
Porphyry, who became an archimandrite of the Monastery of Exaltation of the Cross at Kizlyar

References 

1700s births
1773 deaths
Politicians from Georgia (country)
House of Mukhrani
Iranian people of Georgian descent
Afsharid generals
Military personnel of the Russian Empire
Converts to Eastern Orthodoxy from Shia Islam
Former Muslims from Georgia (country)
18th-century military personnel from the Russian Empire
18th-century people from Georgia (country)